Hei is the debut album of the Norwegian teen duo Marcus & Martinus, winners of the Norwegian Melodi Grand Prix Junior 2012. The album released on Sony Music Entertainment on 23 February 2015 and was successful, peaking at number 1 on the Norwegian Albums Chart. A special follow-up album was released nine months later on 6 November 2015 also on Sony including additional tracks. The special edition was titled Hei – Fan-Spesial.

Singles
"To dråper vann" was released as the lead single from the album in 2012. The song has peaked to number 8 on the Norwegian Singles Chart. "Leah" was released as the second single from the album on 25 July 2013. "Du" was released as the third single from the album in 2014. "Smil" was released as the fourth single from the album in October 2014. "Plystre på deg" was released as the fourth single from the album on 17 February 2015. "Elektrisk" was released as the lead single from the re-released album on 24 July 2015. The song has peaked to number 3 on the Norwegian Singles Chart and number 8 on the Swedish Singles Chart. "Ei som deg" was released as the second single from the re-released album on 25 September 2015. The song has peaked to number 15 on the Norwegian Singles Chart. "Alt jeg ønsker meg" was released as the third single from the re-released album on 30 October 2015.

Track listing

Charts

Weekly charts

Year-end charts

Release history

References

2015 debut albums
Norwegian-language albums